Robert David "Lu" Edmonds (born 9 September 1957) is an English rock and folk musician. He is currently, as of 2018, a vocalist and saz and cümbüş player in the Mekons and the lead guitarist for Public Image Limited. Edmonds reportedly plays electric guitar, bass guitar, keyboards, bouzouki, saz, cümbüs, oud, and drums, among other instruments.

Personal life 
Growing up abroad in Poland, South America, Russia and Cyprus, Edmonds was educated in local schools and at Ampleforth College.  As of 2018, he resided in Ireland.

Rock music 
Edmonds is currently, as of 2018, a vocalist and saz and cümbüş player  in the Mekons, and also the lead guitarist for Public Image Limited.

Edmonds first came to prominence as a member of the Damned, playing guitar on their second album, 1977's Music For Pleasure. It was the rest of the band that nicknamed him "Lu"—short for "Lunatic".  Billed simply as "Lu" while with the Damned, subsequent bands billed him as Lu Edmonds (or occasionally "Lu Knee"). He has played in Public Image Ltd, the Spizzles, the Mekons, Shriekback, as a Bloke in Billy Bragg & the Blokes as well as on tracks by the Waterboys and Kirsty MacColl. He also co-wrote songs with MacColl for her first album and played lead guitar on her first single "They Don't Know" (and also on the cover of that song by comedian Tracey Ullman).

In 1979 Edmonds was guitarist/vocalist in new-wave band the Edge. This band also featured drummer Jon Moss, (whom Edmonds met in the Damned, and who went on to become the drummer in Culture Club), bassist Glyn Havard (who played in proto neo-age prog-rock gods Jade Warrior) and keyboardist Gavin Povey (who later played with UK virtuoso guitarist Albert Lee in Albert Lee & Hogan's Heroes).

Eclectic music 
In the early years (1982–?) of the band 3 Mustaphas 3, "world music" pioneers, Edmonds played various instruments under the pseudonym Uncle Patrel Mustapha Bin Mustapha. Then Edmonds and Ben Mandelson, both former "Mustaphas", created two trios: in 2009 Blue Blokes 3 with Ian A. Anderson, releasing the album Stubble (Fledg'ling Records); and in 2010 Les Triaboliques with fellow picker Justin Adams, releasing the album Rivermudtwilight. In 2010, Edmonds appeared on Poets and Lighthouses, the latest album by Albert Kuvezin of the Tuvan ethnic-rock fusion group Yat Kha. In 2019, Edmonds and Mark Roberts, as Blabbermouth, released the album Hörspiel ("Hörspiel" being German for "radio drama" or "audio play"), with several guest musicians, including Rico Bell and Sally Timms of the Mekons, and Albert Kuvezin.

Circa 2000–2015, Edmonds spent several years helping local musicians in Western Siberia and Central Asia to promote their work and to set up recording facilities.

References

External links
 Biography & Discography

English rock guitarists
English bass guitarists
English male guitarists
Male bass guitarists
English keyboardists
English multi-instrumentalists
People from Welwyn Garden City
Living people
The Damned (band) members
Public Image Ltd members
1957 births
People educated at Ampleforth College
Musicians from Hertfordshire
The Mekons members